Nordkreis Weimar is a former Verwaltungsgemeinschaft in the district Weimarer Land in Thuringia, Germany. It was formed on 31 December 2013 by the merger of the former Verwaltungsgemeinschaften Berlstedt and Buttelstedt. The seat of the Verwaltungsgemeinschaft was in Berlstedt. It was disbanded in January 2019.

The Verwaltungsgemeinschaft Nordkreis Weimar consisted of the following municipalities:

 Ballstedt 
 Berlstedt 
 Buttelstedt 
 Ettersburg 
 Großobringen 
 Heichelheim 
 Kleinobringen 
 Krautheim 
 Leutenthal 
 Neumark 
 Ramsla 
 Rohrbach 
 Sachsenhausen 
 Schwerstedt 
 Vippachedelhausen
 Wohlsborn

References

Former Verwaltungsgemeinschaften in Thuringia